Emigre may refer to:

 Émigré, a person who has emigrated
 Émigré (album), the debut solo studio album by Australian singer-songwriter Wendy Matthews
 Emigre (magazine), a graphic design magazine
 Emigre (type foundry), a digital type foundry